Chronoxenus is a genus of ants in the subfamily Dolichoderinae. The genus is known from Asia.

Species
Chronoxenus butteli (Forel, 1913)
Chronoxenus dalyi (Forel, 1895)
Chronoxenus myops (Forel, 1895)
Chronoxenus rossi (Donisthorpe, 1950)
Chronoxenus walshi (Forel, 1895)
Chronoxenus wroughtonii (Forel, 1895)

References

Dolichoderinae
Ant genera
Hymenoptera of Asia
Taxa named by Felix Santschi